Raja Sir Harnam Singh Ahluwalia , KCIE (15 November 1851 – 20 May 1930) was a member of the Kapurthala royal family in the direct line founded by Jassa Singh Ahluwalia.

He was the first president of the All India Conference of Indian Christians, which played an important role in the Indian independence movement, advocating for self-rule and opposing the partition of India. He was also a member of the Kapurthala Council of State and one of the founder trustees of the Tribune Newspaper. He also was one of the patrons of the New India Insurance company founded in 1906 in Calcutta under the Swaraj movement. It was later nationalised to become India's 4th largest Insurance Company National Insurance Company.

Biography 
Harnam Singh was the second son of Raja Sir Randhir Singh Ahluwalia , GCSI, Raja of Kapurthala, and younger brother of Raja Karak Singh Bahadur. He left Kapurthala in 1878 after the premature death of his elder brother led to a struggle for the succession to the Kapurthala throne. Under the influence of his English Tutor Rev. Woodside and aided by a Bengali Missionary Golaknath Chatterji, Harnam Singh converted to Christianity thus renouncing his rights for good.

Raja Harnam Singh held many dignities in his life. He was a member of the Legislative Council for the Punjab from 1900 to 1902, a Member of the Kapurthala Council of State and an honorary Fellow of Panjab University. In 1902 he and his wife were in London to attend the Coronation of King Edward VII and Queen Alexandra, as representatives of the Christian community in India.

He was appointed a Companion of the Order of the Indian Empire (CIE) in 1885 and knighted as a Knight Commander of the order (KCIE) in 1898. In 1907, Harnam Singh was given the personal title of Raja (roughly equivalent to the modern British life peerage), and he was made a hereditary Raja in 1911, thus enabling him to found a separate branch of the Ahluwalia dynasty.
He was given the administration of his Awadh properties for his lifetime, a move which was objected by Jagatjit Singh but in vain.

Harnam Singh died in 1930 at the age of 78, and was succeeded in his title by his eldest son, Raghubir Singh, who himself died two years later without issue. whereupon the title devolved upon his second surviving son, Raja Maharaj Singh. The line of Maharaj Singh maintains the title to this day.

Family
In 1875, he married Rani Priscilla Kaur Sahiba (née Priscilla Golaknath), and had nine children, seven sons and two daughters:
 Raja Raghbhir Singh, OBE (3 May 1876 – 17 November 1932)
 Kanwar Rajendra Singh (1877–1883)
 Raja Sir Maharaj Singh, CIE, CStJ (17 May 1878 – 6 June 1959), who had issue (see article)
 Lieutenant Colonel Dr. Kanwar Shamsher Singh, M.D.,  MRCS, LRCP (21 June 1879–?)
 Captain Dr. Kanwar Indrajit Singh, MC, M.D., MRCP (27 December 1883 – 23 November 1914) (KIA)
 Kanwar Sir Dalip Singh (2 June 1885 – 13 January 1971)
 Kanwar Jasbir Singh, CIE (16 June 1887 – 15 October 1942), who had issue including:
Air Vice Marshal Kanwar Jaswant Singh, PVSM (1915–1963)
Lieutenant Kanwar Billy Arjan Singh (1917–2010)
 Rajkumari Bibiji Amrit Kaur, DStJ (2 February 1889 – 9 February 1964)
 Bibi Raj Kaur (29 May 1882 – 29 May 1882)

Titles
1852–1885: Kanwar Harnam Singh
1885–1898: Kanwar Harnam Singh, Ahluwalia, CIE
1898–1900: Kanwar Sir Harnam Singh Bahadur, KCIE
1900–1907: The Hon Kanwar Sir Harnam Singh Bahadur, KCIE
1907–1930: The Hon Raja Shri Sir Harnam Singh, KCIE

Honours
 Knight Commander of the Order of the Indian Empire (KCIE – 1898) (CIE – 1885)
 Prince of Wales's Medal in silver – 1876
 KIH Silver Medal – 1877
 Queen Victoria Golden Jubilee Medal – 1887
 King Edward VII Coronation Medal in silver – 1902
 Delhi Durbar Medal in silver – 1903
 Personal title of Raja – 1907
 Delhi Durbar Medal in silver – 1911
 Hereditary title of Raja – 1911

See also
 The Kapurthala Royal Collateral Families
 Rajkumari Bibiji Amrit Kaur
 Billy Arjan Singh
 Bikrama Singh
 Vishvjit Singh
 Pratap Singh

References

Indian Christians
Indian royalty
1851 births
1930 deaths
Knights Commander of the Order of the Indian Empire
People from Kapurthala
Punjabi people
Members of the Punjab Legislative Assembly
Indian knights
Converts to Christianity from Sikhism